César Gerardo Elizondo Quezada (born 10 February 1988 in Pérez Zeledón, Costa Rica) is a footballer who plays as a striker for Pérez Zeledón.

Club career
His debut with Deportivo Saprissa in 2005 with 17 years old after the U-17 World Cup in Peru, then in 2007 played the U-20 World Cup in Canada the same year he signed his professional contract for Deportivo Saprissa where he achieved 3 national titles and a second place in CONCACAF Champions League.

For one season also played for Municipal Pérez Zeledón in 2009, in December 2012 left Saprissa and went to Thai Premier League Champions Buriram United where he won a Toyota Cup Championship.

In 2013 he came to the NASL where he made his debut for Carolina RailHawks. After a year in North Carolina, Elizondo moved to the Alamo City with San Antonio Scorpions. He scored 5 goals as San Antonio won the Fall Season Title and the NASL 2014 Championship. In the 2015 season he scored 3 goals. At the end of the 2015 season the franchise ceased operations.

International career
He played in the 2005 FIFA U-17 World Championship held in Peru  where he scored the winning second round qualifying goal for his country and was named in the top 10 players of the World Cup Elizondo also participated in the 2007 FIFA U-20 World Cup held in Canada.

He made his senior debut for Costa Rica in a January 2011 Copa Centroamericana match against Honduras and has, as of May 2014, earned a total of 10 caps.

References

External links
 
 Profile - Railhawks

1988 births
Living people
Association football forwards
Costa Rican men's footballers
Costa Rica international footballers
2011 Copa Centroamericana players
2011 Copa América players
Deportivo Saprissa players
Bayamón FC players
Municipal Pérez Zeledón footballers
Cesar Elizondo
North Carolina FC players
San Antonio Scorpions players
San Antonio FC players
Costa Rican expatriate footballers
Expatriate footballers in Puerto Rico
Expatriate footballers in Thailand
Expatriate soccer players in the United States
North American Soccer League players
USL Championship players
Costa Rica under-20 international footballers
Costa Rica youth international footballers